Carlo Ponti Jr. (born 29 December 1968) is an Italian orchestral conductor working in the United States. He is the son of late film producer Carlo Ponti Sr. and Italian actress Sophia Loren, and the older brother of film director Edoardo Ponti.

Early life
Born in Geneva, Switzerland, Ponti worked at the Conductor's Institute in Connecticut, under the direction of Harold Farberman from 1994–96, worked with Mehli Mehta, Zubin Mehta, and Andrey Boreyko in Los Angeles from 1997-99, and furthered his musical studies in Austria at the Vienna Musikhochschule from 1999 to 2001 under Leopold Hager and Erwin Acel.

Career 
He has guest conducted internationally and was the recipient of various awards for fostering the growth of young musical talent through music education. Ponti has been associate conductor of the Russian National Orchestra from 2000 to 2018 and was music director and principal conductor of the San Bernardino Symphony from 2001 to 2013. In 2013 he founded the Los Angeles Virtuosi Orchestra, an ensemble emphasizing music's educational value of which he is artistic and music director. The Los Angeles Virtuosi Orchestra is currently performing its eight concert season (2022–2023) in Los Angeles.

Ponti has released two recordings with the Russian National Orchestra on the Pentatone label and his work and performances have been featured on ABC, CBS, NBC/Universal, NPR, PBS, ORF, Sky News, Spectrum, KTLA, Fox News, Leonard Lopate, Dennis Miller, Symphony Magazine, Classical KUSC, the Associated Press, American Public Media's Performance Today and America's Music Festivals.

Orchestral ensembles conducted by Carlo Ponti
Listed alphabetically

ADDA Simfonica
Alba Regia Symphony Orchestra
American Youth Symphony
Budapest Concert Orchestra
Budapest Strings Orchestra
Cape Town Philharmonic Orchestra
Cape Town Youth Orchestra
Castile and Leon Symphony Orchestra
Cyprus Symphony Orchestra
Festival Orchestra NAPA
Los Angeles Virtuosi Orchestra
Orquesta Sinfónica de Mineria
Moscow Chamber Orchestra
Napa Valley Symphony Orchestra
Orquesta Sinfónica de Galicia
Orchestra del Maggio Musicale Fiorentino
Orchestra della Magna Grecia
Málaga Philharmonic Orchestra
Felix Mendelssohn Jugendorchester
Coro e Orchestra del Teatro San Carlo
Orchestre Philharmonique de Strasbourg
Orquesta de Valencia
Pro Arte Orchestra
Roma Sinfonietta Orchestra
Russian National Orchestra
Orchestra della Repubblica di San Marino
Samara Philharmonic Orchestra
San Bernardino Symphony
Simon Bolivar Symphony Orchestra
Slovak Philharmonic Orchestra
Sphinx Symphony Orchestra
Chorus and Orchestra of the State Opera of Georgia
Taurida Symphony Orchestra
Verbier Festival Orchestra
Veryovka Ukrainian Folk Choir
Winnipeg Symphony Orchestra
UCLA Philharmonia Orchestra
Ural Philharmonic Orchestra

Festival and event appearances
Listed alphabetically
Avila Primavera Fest, Spain
Bratislava Spring Music Festival, Slovakia
Europaischer Kulturpreis, Austria
Festival d'Echternach, France
Festival Napa Valley, United States
Festival de Villena, Spain
United Nations WTO Global Youth Tourism Summit, Italy
Julio Musical, Spain
Festival Vancouver, Canada
Koln Musik Triennale, Germany
Lake Tahoe Music Festival, United States
Maggio Musicale Fiorentino, Italy
Montecatini International Opera Festival and Academy, Italy
Royal Days (Kiralyi Napok), Hungary
St.Petersburg Palaces Festival, Russia
Taichung Music Festival, Taiwan
Tuscan Sun Festival, Italy

Awards
 2006 : Premio Galileo Award for exceptional musical achievement.
 2008 : Artistic Achievement Award from the Virginia Waring International Piano Competition.
 2009 : Spirit of Hope Award from the Childhelp Foundation for his acclaimed work with young musicians.
 2011 : Lupa Di Roma Award (co-recipient) from the Roman City Council.
 2014 : Premio Civitas, XVIII edition, Pozzuoli
 2022: Awardee of Italy’s Assoutenti 40th Anniversary Awards for dedication to the development of orchestral music as a cross-cultural tool to promote peace, unity and communication between nations.

Recordings
2008: Pictures at an Exhibition and other orchestral works by Modest Mussorgsky (1839-1881), with the Russian National Orchestra on  PENTATONE (PTC 5186332), SACD
2011: Scheherazade, Capriccio Espagnol and other orchestral works by Nicolai Rimsky-Korsakov (1844-1908), with the Russian National Orchestra on  PENTATONE (PTC 5186378), SACD

References

External links
 Official Website of Carlo Ponti
 Website of the Los Angeles Virtuosi Orchestra

1958 births
Italian male conductors (music)
Living people
Musicians from Geneva
Italian expatriates in Switzerland
Italian expatriates in the United States
21st-century Italian conductors (music)
21st-century Italian male musicians